A Polish Enigma "double" was a machine produced by the Polish Cipher Bureau that replicated the German Enigma rotor cipher machine.  The Enigma double was one result of Marian Rejewski's remarkable achievement of determining the wiring of the Enigma's rotors and reflectors.

First double

The Polish Cipher Bureau recognized that the Germans were using a new cipher. The Germans had mistakenly shipped a cipher machine to Poland; their attempts to recover a shipment raised the suspicions of Polish customs, and the Polish Cipher Bureau learned that the Germans were using an Enigma machine.  The Bureau purchased a commercial Enigma machine, and it attempted but failed to break the cipher.

In December 1932, the Polish Cipher Bureau tasked Marian Rejewski with breaking the Enigma cipher machine.  A French spy had obtained some material about the Enigma, and the French had provided the material to the Polish Cipher Bureau.  By that time, the commercial Enigma had been extended to use a plugboard.  Rejewski made rapid progress and was able to determine the wiring of the military Enigma.  The Bureau modified its commercial Enigma rotors, reflector, and internal wiring to match the military Enigma.  The commercial Enigma did not have a plugboard, but the plugboard could be simulated by relabeling the keys and the lamps.  The result was the first Enigma double.

AVA
In February 1933, the Polish Cipher Bureau ordered fifteen "doubles" of the military Enigma machine from the AVA Radio Manufacturing Company, in Warsaw. Ultimately, about seventy such functional replicas were produced.

Precious gift
In August 1939, following a tripartite meeting of French, British, and Polish cryptologists held near Warsaw on 25 and 26 July, two Enigma replicas were passed to Poland's allies, one sent to Paris and one to London. Until then, German military Enigma traffic had defeated the British and French, and they had faced the disturbing prospect that German communications would remain "black" to them for the duration of the coming war.

French doubles

After Germany invaded Poland in September 1939 and key Polish Cipher Bureau personnel had been evacuated to France, the Cipher Bureau resumed its interrupted work at PC Bruno, outside Paris.  The Poles had only three replica Enigma machines to work with, and these were wearing out from round-the-clock use.  French Army intelligence officer Gustave Bertrand ordered parts for forty machines from a French precision-mechanics firm.  Manufacture proceeded sluggishly, however, and it was only after the fall of France and the opening of underground work in southern France's Free Zone in October 1940 that four machines were finally assembled.

See also
 Saxon Palace, in Warsaw, where German Enigma ciphers were first broken in December 1932

Notes

References

External links
 Slawo Wesolkowski, "The Invention of Enigma and How the Polish Broke It Before the Start of WWII"
 http://www.cryptomuseum.com/crypto/enigma/hist.htm has picture of Enigma double (http://www.cryptomuseum.com/crypto/enigma/polish/img/polish_enigma_1.jpg)
 http://www.codesandciphers.org.uk/virtualbp/poles/poles.htm has picture of Enigma double

Cipher Bureau (Poland)
Enigma machine
History of cryptography
Science and technology in Poland